Margarita Perveņecka (born 16 January 1976 in Riga) is a Latvian playwright and prose writer. Her works have been performed in numerous Latvian theatres, and are noted for displaying an unusual view of the world, poetic expression, foreign words, science terms and neologisms, creating an alienated society. She received the Literatūras gada balva (Literature award) in 2011 for her novel, "Gaetano Krematoss".

Works

Plays
 Civilķēde jeb Jautrais karuselis. Žurnālā "Teātra Vēstnesis", 1998; iestudēta teātrī ACUD, Berlīnē, 2002
 Neaizmirstulīšu desas papīrs, ar nosaukumu Ņezabudka vulgaris iestudēta teātrī "TT", 2002
 Drakula (pēc B. Stokera motīviem), iestudēta Daugavpils teātrī, 2003
 Ludviga prodžekts, iestudēta Dailes teātrī, 2004
 Man patika dedzināt, iestudēta Dirty Deal Teatro, 2012

Screenplays 
 Rehabilitācija. Žurnālā "Luna", 2000
 Atved mani mājās. Ekranizēts ar nosaukumu "Man patīk, ka meitene skumst", 2003

Prose 
 Visi koki aizgājuši: stāsti. Rīga: Dienas grāmata, 2006
 Gaetāno Krematoss: atmiņas par gaismu: romāns. Rīga, Dienas grāmata, 2011

References

Latvian women writers
Latvian dramatists and playwrights
1976 births
Writers from Riga
Living people
Women dramatists and playwrights